Asleh (also Romanized as Aşleh and Asaleh) is a village in Mofatteh Rural District, in the Central District of Famenin County, Hamadan Province, Iran. At the 2006 census, its population was 2,260, in 549 families.

References 

Populated places in Famenin County